Cropwell is an unincorporated community located within Evesham Township in Burlington County, New Jersey, United States. It is the location of the Cropwell Friends Meeting House.

Transportation
New Jersey Transit provides service to and from Philadelphia on the 406 route.

References

Evesham Township, New Jersey
Unincorporated communities in Burlington County, New Jersey
Unincorporated communities in New Jersey